Seán Martin Hingston (from Melbourne, Australia) is a New York-based actor and former dancer.

Filmography

Film

Television

Awards and nominations
During the 2011 he was nominated for Featured Actor in a Musical for the role of Bill Calhoun/Lucentio in the Reprise Theatre Company production of "Kiss Me, Kate"

References

External links
 
 

1965 births
Living people
Australian male musical theatre actors
Male actors from Melbourne